Shreekhandapur (Nepal Bhasa: खम्पू) is a city situated in the Dhulikhel municipality in Kavrepalanchowk district in Nepal.This historical town is about 28 km east from Kathmandu. The city is located roughly at 1400m above sea level. The main attraction of Shreekhandapur is the temple of Swet Bhairav, located approximately 1 km northeast of the town. The name Shreekhandapur was originally given due to the presence of the tree Shreekhand. Its name during the Licchavi period was खम्पू which is still used predominantly by the Newar community living in this town.

History

Shreekhandapur is historically important city which was a major part of the trade route towards the southern part of the country. Merchants would have to go through this city before the invent of modern transportation. The city was incorporated in the kingdom of Nepal by Prithvi Narayan Shah during his unification around 1820 Bikram Sambat. The various parts of the town have their own names as well.

The eastern part is referred to as bahatol, the part which has the Nasika temple towards north east is referred to as Nastol, the north west part is referred to as bhukhatol, the western part is referred to as basatol, and the middle part of the town is referred to as chaftol. The residents of chaftol were originally brought to Shreekhandapur from Bhaktapur and Lalitpur by Prithvi Narayan Shah to build economic foundation to this town during the unification of Nepal. Particularly, the Karmacharya's were from Bhaktapur and Dhunju's were from Lalitpur.

Festivals

Bisket Jatra is a major festival which is celebrated during the new year period based on the Bikram Sambat calendar. It is as important as the Dashain festival for the locals here in the city. A tree is brought from Bhaktapur and raised in the city for seven days to celebrate the festival. They carry the statue of Ganesh, Kumar, and Bhairav in specially made Chariot and take it around all parts of the town to celebrate the festival.

Gai Jatra is celebrated yearly by the locals to honor their late family members.

Transportation

The city is connected to the capital city Kathmandu through the Arniko Rajmarg.

Education
 Shreekhandapur higher secondary school
 Kathmandu University is located about 1 km towards east of the town

References

 Dhulikhel Municipality
 Dhulikhel Government Site
 The Himalayan Times National Newspaper tags on Shreekhandapur
 The Himalayan Times National Newspaper News article

Cities in Nepal